Basia Frydman (17 June 1946 – 21 August 2016) was a Swedish actress, engaged at the Royal Dramatic Theatre in Stockholm. She married Swedish actor Tomas Laustiola. 

She studied at the Swedish National Academy of Mime and Acting until 1972. At the 29th Guldbagge Awards, she was nominated for the Best Actress award for her role in The Slingshot. In 1991 she, Tomas Laustiola and Pierre Fränckel founded the Judiska Teatern (Jewish Theatre) in Stockholm.

Filmography
2002 – Beck – Kartellen
1999 – S:t Mikael (TV)
1999 – Mayn harts gehert tsum tatn
1995 – Sweet Home Blues
1995 – Morsarvet (TV)
1995 – Stannar du så springer jag
1993 – Pariserhjulet
1993 – Kådisbellan
1991 – Freud flyttar hemifrån...
1987 – Varuhuset (TV)
1985 – Anmäld försvunnen (TV)
1984 – Sköna juveler
1983 – Lille Luj och Änglaljus i strumpornas hus (TV)

References

Further reading

External links
Basia Frydman on the Royal Dramatic Theatre's website
Basia Frydman on Swedish Film Database

1946 births
2016 deaths
Place of death missing
Swedish film actresses
Swedish Jews
Swedish people of Polish-Jewish descent
Swedish television actresses
People from Świebodzin County
Polish emigrants to Sweden
20th-century Swedish actresses
21st-century Swedish actresses